Sterling Siloe Yatéké (born 15 September 1999) is a Central African professional footballer who plays for Danish 1st Division side FC Helsingør.

References

External links
 

1999 births
Living people
Association football forwards
Central African Republic footballers
Turun Palloseura footballers
FK Austria Wien players
HNK Rijeka players
FC Helsingør players
Veikkausliiga players
Austrian Football Bundesliga players
Croatian Football League players
Danish 1st Division players
Central African Republic expatriate footballers
Expatriate footballers in Finland
Expatriate footballers in Austria
Expatriate footballers in Croatia
Expatriate footballers in Denmark
Central African Republic expatriate sportspeople in Finland
Central African Republic expatriate sportspeople in Austria